Tina Vukasovič (born 9 June 1975) is a Slovenian former professional tennis player. Since retiring she has worked in academia as a specialist in the field of marketing and holds a PhD from the University of Primorska.

Born in Ptuj, Vukasovič was a Slovenian national singles champion. She played Federation Cup tennis in 1992 and 1993, which were Slovenia's first two seasons in the competition, winning all three singles rubbers and two of her three doubles rubbers. While competing on the professional tour in the 1990s she reached a career high singles ranking of 478 in the world. She won three doubles titles on the ITF circuit and had a best doubles ranking of 277.

Vukasovič's younger sister Nena was also a professional tennis player.

ITF finals

Singles: 1 (0–1)

Doubles: 5 (3–2)

See also
List of Slovenia Fed Cup team representatives

References

External links
 
 
 

1975 births
Living people
Slovenian female tennis players
Yugoslav female tennis players
People from Ptuj